SMEC Holdings Limited (formerly Snowy Mountains Engineering Corporation) is an Australian based-firm that provides consulting services on major infrastructure projects around the world. SMEC undertakes feasibility studies, design, tender and contract management, construction supervision and project management. The company provides engineering services for transport, hydropower and energy, water and environment and resources projects. Its head office is located in Melbourne, Victoria.

On 1 August 2016, the Singapore-based Surbana Jurong announced it had acquired SMEC for US$298 million (S$400 million).

Background

Between 1949 and 1974 the Snowy Mountains Authority (SMA) undertook a massive hydro-electric and irrigation project, the Snowy Mountains Scheme, in the Snowy Mountains of New South Wales.  The work included sixteen dams, seven power stations,  of tunnels,  of aqueducts,  and much other construction.  It was completed on time and within budget. The work showcased Australian engineering, and in the 1960s the SMA was given projects in Thailand, Sabah, Papua New Guinea and Cambodia.

History

In 1970 the Snowy Mountains Engineering Corporation (SMEC) was established to preserve and market the expertise that SMA had acquired.  Many of the early projects were funded by the Australian International Development Assistance Bureau (AIDAB). By 1991, the Snowy Mountains Engineering Corporation (SMEC) was a public company with 220 staff. The company was wholly owned by the Australian Government, and provided engineering consulting and project management services around the world. SMEC became a Commonwealth Government owned public company in 1989, and in 1993 SMEC was sold to staff by the government. SMEC's total revenue in the 2012 financial year was $420 million. SMEC's total revenue in the 2015 financial year was A$537 million. As of 2015 SMEC had over 5,400 employees around the world.

In August 2016 SMEC was implicated in alleged corporate bribery incidents in both Sri Lanka and the Congo, after the firm sought to secure multi-million dollar contracts in those countries.

In 2016 SMEC was bought by Singapore-based Surbana Jurong for around $400 million.

References
10.Our Training Centre SMEClabs
Multinational companies headquartered in Australia
Holding companies of Australia
2016 mergers and acquisitions